Garth B. Robinson (born 11 October 1970 in London) is a retired male track and field athlete from Jamaica. Robinson won a bronze medal at the 1996 Summer Olympics in Atlanta.

References
 

1970 births
Living people
Jamaican male sprinters
Olympic athletes of Jamaica
Athletes (track and field) at the 1996 Summer Olympics
Athletes (track and field) at the 1999 Pan American Games
Athletes (track and field) at the 1994 Commonwealth Games
Athletes (track and field) at the 1998 Commonwealth Games
Olympic bronze medalists for Jamaica
Commonwealth Games medallists in athletics
Medalists at the 1996 Summer Olympics
Pan American Games bronze medalists for Jamaica
Olympic bronze medalists in athletics (track and field)
Commonwealth Games silver medallists for Jamaica
Pan American Games medalists in athletics (track and field)
Universiade medalists in athletics (track and field)
Universiade silver medalists for Jamaica
World Athletics Indoor Championships medalists
Medalists at the 1997 Summer Universiade
Medalists at the 1999 Pan American Games
Central American and Caribbean Games medalists in athletics
Medallists at the 1994 Commonwealth Games
Jamaican masters athletes